Agave bracteosa is a species of agave sometimes known as spider agave or squid agave. It is native to the Sierra Madre Oriental of Mexico, in the states of Tamaulipas, Coahuila and Nuevo León. It is found on cliffs and rocky slopes from 900 to 1,700 meters. Although it occupies a small range, it is not considered to be threatened.

Small among the agaves, its green succulent leaves are long and lanceolate, 50–70 cm long and 3–5 cm at the base, where they are the widest. They have minute serrations (teeth) along the margins, but no teeth nor spine at the end. The leaves have a tendency to curl somewhat, in a fashion reminiscent of the octopus agave A. vilmoriniana. The inflorescence spike is also short at 1.2–1.7 meters, and its upper third is densely covered with white or pale yellow flowers. The flowers are distinctive in that tepals arise from a disk-shaped receptacle rather than the usual tube. The stamens are quite long.

Gentry defines a group "Choritepalae" that includes A. bracteosa along with Agave ellemeetiana and Agave guiengola, and states that the discoid receptacle and unarmed leaves are different enough from other agaves to justify placing A. bracteosa and A. ellemeetiana into a separate genus, but that characteristics of A.  guiengola link the group to the rest of Agave.

References

bracteosa
Endemic flora of Mexico
Flora of Coahuila
Flora of Nuevo León
Flora of Tamaulipas
Flora of the Sierra Madre Oriental
Garden plants of North America